Queralbs is a municipality in the comarca of the Ripollès in the province of Girona, Catalonia, Spain. It is situated in the Pyrenees to the north of Ribes de Freser, near the peaks of Puigmal (2909 m), Infern (2896 m) and Noufonts (2864 m). Tourism and hydroelectricity are the bases of the local economy. The Virgin of Nuria shrine is situated in the municipality, to the north of the village in Vall de Núria: it houses a romanesque mural image of la Mare de Déu de Núria. The shrine is reached by Vall de Núria Rack Railway from Ribes de Freser, which also serves the village. There is also a local road to Ribes de Freser, which serves the ski resort.

The first historical mention of Queralbs is in the consecration act of the church of the Urgell Diocese in 836—thus the town's motto, poble mil·lenari (millennial town)—and its Romanesque church, dedicated to Saint James, dates to the late tenth century.

Earthquakes
Queralbs is located to the north-west of the active Amer-Brugent fault system. Queralbs was entirely destroyed in the Catalan earthquake of 1428 whose epicentre was in nearby Camprodon.

Demography

Notable people 
For many years, Queralbs was the vacation home for the former president of the Generalitat, Jordi Pujol.

See also 
Vall de Núria Rack Railway

References

 Panareda Clopés, Josep Maria; Rios Calvet, Jaume; Rabella Vives, Josep Maria (1989). Guia de Catalunya, Barcelona: Caixa de Catalunya.  (Spanish).  (Catalan).

External links
Official website
 Government data pages 

Municipalities in Ripollès
Populated places in Ripollès